Gilles Delion (born 5 August 1966) is a French former road bicycle racer. His greatest achievements include winning the Giro di Lombardia in 1990 and the young rider classification in the 1990 Tour de France.

Early in his career, Delion was seen as a great promise, but Delion ended his career in 1996, saying that at that point doping was widespread in the cycling peloton, and that all French teams were involved. Willy Voet wrote in his book "Massacre à la chaîne" that Delion was against doping, and that other cyclists ridiculed Delion for that.

Major results

1988
 3rd Overall Ronde de l'Isard
 3rd Grand Prix des Amériques
1989
 1st Gran Premio di Lugano
 2nd Overall Tour de Romandie
 2nd Giro di Lombardia
 3rd GP Ouest–France
 7th Giro dell'Emilia
 7th Milano–Torino
1990
 1st  Young rider classification Tour de France
 1st Giro di Lombardia
 2nd Overall Critérium International
1st Stage 2
 2nd Giro dell'Emilia
 2nd Giro del Lazio
 3rd Overall Tirreno–Adriatico
 3rd Milan–San Remo
 3rd Milano–Torino
 5th UCI Road World Cup
 9th Züri-Metzgete
1991
 4th Wincanton Classic
 9th Overall Tour Méditerranéen
1992
 1st Classique des Alpes
 1st Stage 7 Tour de France
 3rd Grand Prix La Marseillaise
 4th Overall Tour Méditerranéen
1993
 Mi-Août Bretonne
1st Stages 3 & 8
 3rd Overall Tour du Limousin
 5th Overall Tour Méditerranéen
 10th Giro dell'Emilia
1994
 1st Grand Prix de Rennes
 1st Grand Prix d'Ouverture La Marseillaise
 2nd Overall Tour de l'Ain
1st Stage 2

References

External links
Profile by velo-club.net 
Cyclisme-dopage profile

1966 births
Living people
French male cyclists
French Tour de France stage winners
Sportspeople from Saint-Étienne
Cyclists from Auvergne-Rhône-Alpes